Francesco Pénna (9 April 1865 – 1927) was an Italian sculptor.

Biography
He was born in Naples. He completed his studies at the Institute of Fine Arts of Naples, where he won a variety of contests, and dedicated himself to industrial sculptural art in terra cotta and ceramic, working mostly from Rome and Milan. He garnered prizes for this at the Exhibition of Melbourne, Australia, and at Buenos Aires, Argentina. At the first of these Exhibitions he sent large chalices in ceramic and terracotta. To New Orleans, Louisiana he sent a small sculpture depicting The Orphan of Casamicciola which won a gold medal. Many of his works were sold in Buenos Aires. His Alcestis Revived (1912) is in the Galleria d'arte Moderna of Milan. He also made portraits and funeral monuments.

References

1865 births
1927 deaths
19th-century Neapolitan people
Italian male sculptors
20th-century Italian sculptors
20th-century Italian male artists
19th-century Italian sculptors
Accademia di Belle Arti di Napoli alumni
19th-century Italian male artists